Zelleria hepariella is a moth of the family Yponomeutidae. It is found in Europe and northern Asia Minor.

The wingspan is 12–14 mm. The head varies from reddish-brown to ochreous-whitish. Forewings are red-brown, sometimes suffusedly irrorated with dark fuscous, towards dorsum sometimes obscurely paler; second discal stigma sometimes obscurely dark fuscous. Hindwings dark grey, lighter anteriorly. The larva is light green; dorsal line dark green; head yellowish-brown.

Adults are on wing in July or August depending on the location.

The larvae feed on Fraxinus excelsior, Lonicera and Artemisia.

References

External links
 www.lepiforum.de
 Swedish Moths
 UKmoths
 Fauna Europaea

Moths described in 1849
Yponomeutidae
Moths of Japan
Moths of Europe
Insects of Turkey